John Arlington "Dizzy" Moore OD was a Jamaican trumpet player and founding member of pioneering Jamaican ska and reggae act The Skatalites.

Biography
A friend of his attended the Alpha Boys School, which catered for wayward boys and was renowned for its strong musical programme, and impressed by his playing, Moore decided on a strategy of misbehaving to get sent there himself, which worked after (he later claimed) pulling "a couple of pranks" to show that he was "going haywire". While at the school he took up the trumpet and studied musical composition under bandleader Ruben Delgado. On leaving the school, he joined the army, playing in the Jamaica Military Band. He was dismissed from the army after three years on a charge of being "not amenable to military service". He then joined the Mapletoft Poulle Orchestra, and Eric Dean's band, but was thrown out for growing dreadlocks. He regularly visited the Rastafarian camp led by Count Ossie at Wareika Hill, and worked as a session musician in the early 1960s, and played in studio band The Cavaliers. Moore and other Cavaliers members Jackie Mittoo, Lloyd Brevett, and Lloyd Knibb then  joined with Tommy McCook in the new band The Skatalites in 1964. When the Skatalites split into two bands in 1965, Moore joined the Soul Vendors, led by Roland Alphonso. The Skatalites reformed in 1983, with many of the original members, including Moore.

In October 2007, Moore was awarded the Order of Distinction in the Rank of Officer (OD) for pioneering work in popularising Jamaican music.

Moore died of colon cancer on 16 August 2008 at the age of 69.

Discography

Solo
Something Special, High Times
 Riot

with Bob Marley & The Wailers
Wail'n Soul'm Singles Selecta

with Lee Perry
Chicken Scratch

References

External links
Johnny Moore Interview by Jah Rebel

Jamaican reggae musicians
1938 births
2008 deaths
Musicians from Kingston, Jamaica
Jamaican trumpeters
Jamaican ska musicians
Deaths from colorectal cancer
Deaths from cancer in Jamaica
The Skatalites members
Officers of the Order of Distinction
20th-century trumpeters
Jamaican military musicians